The NGCB South Lake Tahoe is a partial list of casinos in Douglas County, Nevada. Three other casinos in Douglas county are grouped with the 11 in Carson City, and are referred to as Carson Valley.

Although five licenses are in the county, one is just the race and sports book for the larger casino. Harvey's Resort Hotel dominates this county, and is the only casino with gaming revenue greater than $72 million per year.

Douglas County, Nevada
Gambling in Nevada